Sarabham ( Lion Bird) is a 2014 Indian Tamil-language neo noir mystery film directed by Arun Mohan, son of Anu Mohan, Tamil film actor and produced by C. V. Kumar under his banner Thirukumaran Entertainment. The film features Naveen Chandra, Salony Luthra and Aadukalam Naren in leading roles, while Britto Michael as music director. The film opened to positive reviews from critics in August 2014. The movie is loosely based on the 2003 Japanese thriller Game.

Plot
Vikram (Naveen Chandra) is a young project manager at an architecture firm in Chennai. Though he leads an honest life, he maintains that it is not wrong to do something illegal for money as long as you don't get caught. One day, he goes to his firm's biggest client, Chandrasekar (Aadukalam Naren) to present an ambitious theme park project plan that he had been preparing for months. It is then when Vikram and his colleague see Chandrasekar's rebellious daughter enter the office to demand for money, embarrassing him in front of everyone. Having lost his mood, Chandrasekar coldly rejects Vikram's plan. Vikram gets drunk and then goes to Chandrasekar's beach house to vandalize it. Instead, he sees Chandrasekar's daughter running away. Vikram follows her to a nearby hotel and confronts her about her father's behaviour. She introduces herself as Shruti (Salony Luthra) and reveals that she dislikes her father just as much as Vikram does because he is a materialistic corporate man. Shruti follows Vikram home, where she proposes that he pretend to abduct her in order to extort ransom money from Chandrasekar. Vikram initially refuses. However, he learns from his superior at work the next day that Chandrasekar had a change of heart and has approved his theme park plan in condition that the firm has a more experienced project manager head the project. Vikram becomes ever more furious when his archenemy at the firm is chosen to lead the project and finally agrees to Shruti's plan. Together, Vikram and Shruti easily extort all the black money that Chandrasekar has been hiding away from the income tax department. He then sends Shruti back home safely while promising to keep her share of the money for her while she prepares her passport and visa to run away to Australia.

The next day, Vikram learns from the news that a young girl's dead body resembling Chandrasekar's daughter has been found washed up at the beach. As Vikram panics, Chandrasekar and Shruti walk into his apartment. Chandrasekar then reveals that the rebellious daughter Vikram saw the other day at his office was actually Shruti's twin, Sanjana (Salony Luthra). Shruti accidentally killed Sanjana while trying to stop the latter from taking her drugs. That was when she ran away from home and ended up with Vikram. Her father then calls her up and forces her to help him frame Vikram instead. This was why Chandrasekar approved Vikram's plan out of the blue and then had another project manager hired to further provoke him to have revenge. Chandrasekar then takes back his ransom money in return for not having Vikram arrested by the police for Sanjana's so-called kidnapping and murder.

Furious that he has been played, Vikram decides to really kidnap Shruti for the money. He sees her leaving her father's beach house and takes her away forcefully. He has Chandrasekar bring his money to a warehouse in exchange for Shruti. At the warehouse, Chandrasekar brings a gang along for protection and Vikram has to fight them off. However, it is revealed that Shruti is actually Sanjana all along, and it was Shruti who was killed during their struggle. Knowing that their father would not support her, she pretended to be Shruti all along and had the real Shruti's body look like her instead. Seeing that her father never loved her and was instead happy she had died, she kills him in cold blood and splits the ransom money with Vikram. Sanjana then continues pretending to be Shruti and explains to the police that it was her own father who kidnapped and killed his drug addict daughter with the help of the gang to save his reputation. The gang then goes into hiding for a crime they did not commit. Meanwhile, Sanjana takes over Chandrasekar's company and hires Vikram as the project leader.

Cast
 Naveen Chandra as Vikram
 Salony Luthra as Shruti Chandrasekar & Sanjana Chandrasekar
 Aadukalam Naren as Chandrasekar
 Kadhal Kannan as Sreenivasan
 Boys Rajan as Swaminathan, Vikram's boss
 Shankar Narayanan as Kumar
 Thilak as Thilak
 Sam Anton as Vikram's coworker
 Sai Dheena as Sekhar

Production
C. V. Kumar began work on the production in February 2014 and revealed that he was financing a script titled Sarabham to be directed by newcomer Arun Mohan, son of comedy actor Anu Mohan. Naveen Chandra was cast as the lead actor, while Delhi-based model Salony Luthra was picked after an audition from a hundred artistes. The film was shot within thirty days, two days ahead of schedule, with the team reportedly working five days straight. The film was completed and ready by May 2014, with a press release revealing details of the film publicly. The films songs and trailer were released in June 2014, with the director revealing it would be a crime thriller.

Soundtrack

Release
The film received a U/A Certificate from the censor board and was released on 1 August 2014 in more 150 theatres around Tamil Nadu as well as approximately 200 screens in other states.
It opened to an average response at the box office, collecting 4.25 crore in its opening day.

Baradwaj Rangan of The Hindu described the film as "a good story, but what about the rest?". Rediff.com noted "The film does not get boring, but the thrill element is definitely missing", praising the debutant director; while Sify.com wrote "Sarabham is a perfect weekend watch", highlighting Luthra's performance as "long-lasting".

References

External links

Indian mystery films
2014 films
2010s Tamil-language films
Twins in Indian films
Films about siblings
Sororicide in fiction
Patricide in fiction
Indian remakes of Japanese films
Indian neo-noir films
2014 directorial debut films
Films scored by Britto Michael